Ronald Eguino Segovia (born 20 February 1988) is a Bolivian footballer who currently plays for Club Real Potosí as a centre back.

International career
Eguino played his first international game with the senior national team on 24 February 2010 in and against Mexico (5–0), where he was part of the starting squad and played the entire match. He represented his country in 6 FIFA World Cup qualification matches. as of June 2016.

Honours
Potosí
Bolivian First Division (1): 2007

Bolívar
Bolivian First Division (2): 2011, 2013

References

External links
 
 

1988 births
Living people
People from Chapare Province
Bolivian footballers
Bolivia international footballers
Association football central defenders
Club Bolívar players
Club Real Potosí players
Club San José players
Bolivian Primera División players
2015 Copa América players